Boryslav is a city in the Lviv Oblast of Ukraine.

Boryslav or Borysław may also refer to:

Borysław, Łódź Voivodeship (central Poland)
Boryslav Bereza (born 1974), Ukrainian politician
Boryslav Brondukov (1938–2004), Ukrainian actor